Alloinay is a commune in the department of Deux-Sèvres, western France. The municipality was established on 1 January 2017 by merger of the former communes of Gournay-Loizé (the seat) and Les Alleuds.

See also 
Communes of the Deux-Sèvres department

References 

Communes of Deux-Sèvres
Populated places established in 2017
2017 establishments in France